Hedgehoppers Anonymous were a 1960s beat group from the United Kingdom. They formed in November 1963 as The Trendsetters, and became The Hedgehoppers the following year. Jonathan King took over their record production in 1965, and added Anonymous to their name. Their most successful single was "It's Good News Week".

Singles
The major success of Hedgehoppers Anonymous was the King produced and written "It's Good News Week", issued on Decca. It reached No. 5 on the UK Singles Chart, and No. 48 on Billboards Hot 100. This song has been used as the theme music for Good News Week, a satirical news-based comedy quiz show on Australian television which ran from 1996 to 2000 and was revived in 2008. 

The group released four other tracks but did not achieve significant success. "Don't Push Me" only managed to reach the Bubbling Under Hot 100 chart in the US. while "Daytime" only appeared on Record Mirrors "Breakers List" (chart listing songs outside the Top 50). Without further success, the band soon broke up, and the lack of significant chart activity other than "It's Good News Week" leaves them labelled as one-hit wonders.

Band members
Band members were Royal Air Force personnel. (Hedgehoppers was RAF slang for low flying aircraft).

Singles

See also
List of performances on Top of the Pops

References

External links
Mike Tinsley's website
Garagehangover.com

English pop music groups
Musical groups established in 1963
Beat groups
1963 establishments in the United Kingdom